Proposition 1 was a referendum in the Idaho in 1994, concerning gay rights and minority status. The purpose of Proposition 1 was to prevent homosexual people from receiving minority status in the state. The Idaho Citizens Alliance (ICA) petitioned for 2 years for enough signatures to put their initiative on the November 1994 ballot.  Proposition 1 was defeated in the polls by a majority vote.

History

In January 1992, Kelly Walton, leader of the newly established ICA, announced his intention to pass an initiative that would prevent any citizen of Idaho from receiving "special rights" based on their sexual orientation.  Supporters of the initiative believed that homosexuality was a choice and that minority status should not be granted for a person's behavior.  In order for the initiative to officially make an Idaho ballot, it required signatures. The ICA petitioned and rallied for two years until finally obtaining the required number of signatures to make the November 1994 ballot.

While the ICA petitioned, a pro-LGBT rights group Don't Sign On protested and rallied in opposition. Doing what they could to bring the issue of homosexual rights to the attention of Idaho citizens, Don't Sign On campaigned against Proposition 1 and the ICA.  When Focus on the Family voiced anti-homosexual opinions, Don't Sign On and other homosexual supporters held a vigil in front of Family Forum, the Boise office for Focus on the Family.  The Gay and Lesbian Freedom Day Parade drew 1,167 people to Boise and the organizers of the event credit the anti-gay initiative for the attendance boost. In August 1994, in order to bring even more attention to their cause, Don't Sign On changed their name to No On One.  The No On One Coalition maintained their protests and rallies through the November election. The election came down to the undecided voters who defeated Proposition One.

References

1994 Idaho elections
1994 ballot measures
Idaho ballot measures
Idaho law